Langurs are a subgroup of the Colobinae family of monkeys.

Langur may also refer to:
 Langur, a populated place in Iran, consisting of Langur-e Bala and Langur-e Pain
 , a river in Russia, tributary of the Sosva
 , a settlement in the district of Ivdel, Russia

See also 
 Langor (disambiguation)